Tick Hall was a historic house in Montauk, New York, originally built by Stanford White. It burnt down in 1997, with only the chimney left standing, and rebuilt by its owner Dick Cavett. It was reconstructed without written plans or formal architectural photos. 

A documentary film about the rebuilding was directed by Scott Morris, called From The Ashes: The Life and Times of Tick Hall. It aired in 2003. Tick Hall was one of a group of seven houses designed by the architectural firm of McKim, Mead & White in 1879. The entire district was added to the National Register of Historic Places in 1976.

References

Houses in Suffolk County, New York
East Hampton (town), New York